Johann Ludwig Christian Koelle (18 March 1763 – 30 July 1797) was a German physician and botanist born in Münchberg.

During his career he served as a "Medicinalrath" (medical counselor) and also worked as a county physician in Bayreuth. He was a member of the Regensburgische Botanische Gesellschaft (Botanical Society of Regensburg).

The plant genus Koellia (family Lamiaceae) is named in his honor.

Publications 
 "Spicilegium observationum de aconito", 1787.
 "Flora des Fürstenthumes Bayreuth", 1798.

References 

1763 births
1797 deaths
People from Hof (district)
18th-century German botanists